Kalebalta is a village in the Aksaray District, Aksaray Province, Turkey. Its population is 680 (2021).

The village is populated by Kurds.

References

Villages in Aksaray District
Kurdish settlements in Aksaray Province